Pamela Kay Allen  (née Griffiths; born 3 April 1934) is a New Zealand children's writer and illustrator. She has published over 50 picture books since 1980. Sales of her books have exceeded five million copies.

Early life and family
Born in the Auckland suburb of Devonport in 1934 to Esma Eileen (née Griffith) and William Ewart Griffiths, Allen studied at St Cuthbert's College, then the Elam School of Fine Arts at the University of Auckland, from where she graduated with a Diploma of Fine Arts in 1955. She then worked as a secondary school art teacher. She married sculptor Jim Allen in 1964. They moved to Sydney in about 1977, and after about 30 years returned to live in Auckland, New Zealand.

Writing career
Allen published her first book, Mr Archimedes' Bath, in 1980. Since then she has written and illustrated more than 30 picture books for children.

She has won or been shortlisted for many awards as both a writer and illustrator. She won the Children's Book Council of Australia's Children's Picture Book of The Year Award in 1983 for Who Sank the Boat? and 1984 for Bertie and the Bear, and has been shortlisted for the same award on five other occasions. She twice won the Ethel Turner Prize in the New South Wales Premier's Literary Awards, in 1980 for Mr Archimedes' Bath and 1983 for Who Sank the Boat?.

Allen was awarded the International Board on Books for Young People honour diploma for illustration, for Who Sank the Boat?, in 1984.

In 1986, she received the Library and Information Association of New Zealand Aotearoa Russell Clark Illustration Award for her illustrations in A Lion in the Night.

In 2001, Who Sank The Boat?, first published in 1982, won the Gaelyn Gordon Award—given to the author of a New Zealand children's book that has been a favourite with children over a long period of time—from the New Zealand Book Council.

Allen returned to live in Auckland and in 2004 she won the Margaret Mahy Medal, New Zealand's top children's literature prize. In the 2005 New Year Honours, she was appointed a Member of the New Zealand Order of Merit, for services to children's literature.

Eight of her books have been adapted for the stage by Patch Theatre Company and performed at the Sydney Opera House.

Allen's daughter, Ruth Allen, a Melbourne-based glass sculptor, was commissioned by Penguin Australia in 2008 to create an artwork to celebrate sales of over five million copies of Allen's books.

See also 

A Lion in the Night 
Clippity-Clop 
Cuthbert's Babies 
Belinda
Mr Archimedes' Bath
Who Sank the Boat?
Bertie and the Bear
Herbert and Harry
Fancy That!
I Wish I Had A Pirate Suit
My Cat Maisie
Black Dog
Mr McGee
Mr McGee Goes to Sea
Mr McGee and the Blackberry Jam
Mr McGee and the Biting Flea
Mr McGee and the Perfect Nest
Mr McGee and the Elephants
Alexander's Outing
Waddle Giggle Gargle
The Bear's Lunch
The Pear in the Pear Tree
Inside Mary Elizabeth's House
Can You Keep a Secret?
Brown Bread and Honey
The Potato People
Daisy All-Sorts
Grandpa and Thomas
Grandpa and Thomas and the Green Umbrella
Where's the Gold?
My First ABC
Shhh! Little Mouse
Felix
The Toymaker and the Bird
Hetty's Day Out

Further reading

References

External links 

 Pamela Allen pictorial material and papers, 1974-2016, manuscripts, audio cassettes, video recordings, etchings and illustrations, State Library of New South Wales.

1934 births
Living people
People from North Shore, New Zealand
Elam Art School alumni
New Zealand children's writers
Writers who illustrated their own writing
Members of the New Zealand Order of Merit
New Zealand women children's writers
New Zealand women illustrators
20th-century New Zealand women writers
21st-century New Zealand women writers
20th-century New Zealand writers
21st-century New Zealand writers
New Zealand expatriates in Australia